Me Enamoré is a studio album recorded by Puerto-Rican American singer-songwriter José Feliciano. It was produced by Leonardo Shultz and Feliciano, mixed by Tom Greto, Gary H. Mason and Shultz, mastered by John Matousek, and released in 1983. The album won Feliciano a Grammy Award for Best Latin Pop Performance in 1984.

Track listing

References

1983 albums
José Feliciano albums
Spanish-language albums
Grammy Award for Best Latin Pop Album